Imagica is the first compilation album from The Birthday Massacre. The album features a collection of 11 remastered tracks from the original Imagica 4-track demos and was released July 22, 2016. 
Three songs on the album; "Open Your Heart", "From Out of Nowhere", and "Dead" were never previously released to the public.

Track listing

Notes
 Studio versions of "Over", "Under the Stairs", and "The Birthday Massacre" (re-titled "Happy Birthday") appear on the band's debut album, Nothing and Nowhere.
 Studio versions of "The Birthday Massacre" (re-titled "Happy Birthday") and "Play Dead" appear on the album Violet.
 A studio version of "Remember Me" appears on the album Walking with Strangers.

References

External links

2016 albums
The Birthday Massacre albums